The Allies (sometimes playing as the All-Stars or the Dream Team outside of interstate representative football under an altered composition) is a composite team competing in interstate representative Australian rules football matches that comprises players from Australian Capital Territory, New South Wales, Northern Territory, Queensland and Tasmania. 

The senior men's Allies contested 4 State of Origin matches in 1995, 1996, 1997 and 1998, and the senior women's Allies contested one State of Origin match in 2017. Allies teams have also contested the AFL Under 18/19 Championships since 2016 for boys and 2017 for girls.

History
The team was first proposed as part of the AFL Commission's five-year plan released in August 1994. The AFL Commission in 1991 took over as national governing body, which included administering interstate football; this replaced the council of state-based governing bodies which had run their representative teams independently. The composite team was intended to renew the public's waning interest in the state of origin series by creating a single team which would be selected under pure state of origin rules, and which would be more competitive against the main states (Victoria, South Australia and Western Australia) than any individual minor state team. The venture gave players from those states the opportunity to compete against the main states. The team was launched as the Australian Football Alliance in March 1995, nicknamed the Allies.

The team's first match in 1995 was a win against Western Australia at Subiaco Oval. Its last match under the Allies moniker was in 1998 against Victoria at the Brisbane Cricket Ground, suffering a 53-point loss. Its overall record was two wins (both against Western Australia) and two losses (both against Victoria). The best on ground for the Allies in each game received the Alex Jesaulenko Medal, named in honour of future Hall of Fame Legend Alex Jesaulenko, who began his playing career in Canberra. During its State of Origin tenure, the Allies attracted lower crowds than other major state representative sides; their sole home crowd was 13,977 (in Brisbane) in 1998, when a record six Queenslanders were part of the side.

Dream Team and All-Stars 
The senior Allies team has not competed since the end of State of Origin representative football in 1999. Since that time, composite teams under the names of Dream Team and All-Stars have twice competed in one-off senior State of Origin matches against Victoria; these teams drew on all players of non-Victorian origin, rather than just from the traditional Allies states, and were branded differently to the Allies. These teams played against Victoria in 2008 and in 2020, respectively. A Superules All-Stars team plays in the annual E. J. Whitten Legends Game, held annually since 1996 (barring 2020–2022 due to the COVID-19 pandemic). 

Since 2016, the Allies team has competed in Division 1 of the AFL Under-18/19s Championships. The team is selected from the top players in the former Division 2 state teams – New South Wales/Australian Capital Territory, Queensland, Tasmania and Northern Territory. As of 2021, the team is yet to win a championship.

Identity
The AFL chose the team's name to honour the Allies of World War II, which were celebrating the 50th anniversary of the war victory that year.

The senior Allies wore a guernsey with teal and black halves in 1995, and they added a jagged white-trimmed orange field from 1996. Its guernseys and logos featured a stylised letter A formed from a black star on a white background. Since its re-establishment as an underage team, the Allies guernsey remains based on the 1990s design, but it is predominately sky blue, instead of teal, and adds a dark green stripe and maroon cuffs and socks, thus representing the state sporting colour of each of its composite state and territory teams.

In the AFLW, the team has worn orange and purple. The Dream Team/All-Stars have worn all white and gold/tan, mainly to avoid clashing with the darker Big V jumpers. The AFLW Allies guernsey since 2021 also includes green to acknowledge the inclusion of Tasmania. The latest All-Stars design featured a Commonwealth Star within an A symbol.

1995 Allies AFL State of Origin Squad vs Western Australia in Perth
Coach: 
Captain: 
Vice Captain: 
Deputy Vice Captain: 
Australian Capital Territory	
Brett Allison (North Melbourne Kangaroos)
Don Pyke (West Coast Eagles)
New South Wales
Billy Brownless (Geelong Cats)
Paul Kelly (Sydney Swans)
Northern Territory	
Nathan Buckley (Collingwood Magpies)
Gary Dhurrkay (Fremantle Dockers)
Adrian McAdam (North Melbourne Kangaroos)
Michael McLean (Brisbane Bears)
Darryl White (Brisbane Bears)
Queensland	
Marcus Ashcroft (Brisbane Bears)
Che Cockatoo-Collins (Essendon Bombers)
Gavin Crosisca (Collingwood Magpies)
Tasmania	
Chris Bond (Richmond Tigers)
Matthew Febey (Melbourne Demons)
Steven Febey (Melbourne Demons)
Michael Gale (Richmond Tigers)
Simon Minton-Connell (Hawthorn Hawks)
Ryan O'Connor (Essendon Bombers)
Darrin Pritchard (Hawthorn Hawks)
James Shanahan (St Kilda Saints)
Jason Taylor (Hawthorn Hawks)
Paul Williams (Collingwood Magpies)

1996 Allies AFL State of Origin Squad vs Victoria in Melbourne
Coach: Neale Daniher (New South Wales) 
Captain: Jason Dunstall (Queensland) 
Vice Captain: 
Deputy Vice Captain: 
New South Wales
Billy Brownless (Geelong Cats)
Shane Crawford (Hawthorn Hawks)
Ben Doolan (Essendon Bombers)
Mark Roberts (North Melbourne Kangaroos)
Greg Stafford (Sydney Swans)
Northern Territory	
Nathan Buckley (Collingwood Magpies)
Ronnie Burns (Geelong Cats)
Scott Chisholm (Fremantle Dockers)
Darryl White (Brisbane Bears)
Queensland	
Marcus Ashcroft (Brisbane Bears)
Jason Akermanis (Brisbane Bears)
Che Cockatoo-Collins (Essendon Bombers)
Jason Dunstall (Hawthorn Hawks)
Michael Voss (Brisbane Bears)
Tasmania	
Chris Bond (Richmond Tigers)
Matthew Febey (Melbourne Demons)
Adrian Fletcher (Brisbane Bears)
Michael Gale (Richmond Tigers)
Ryan O'Connor (Essendon Bombers)
Matthew Richardson (Richmond Tigers)
James Shanahan (St Kilda Saints)
Graham Wright (Collingwood Magpies)

1997 Allies AFL State of Origin Squad vs Western Australia in Perth
Coach: Neale Daniher (New South Wales) 
Captain: Jason Dunstall (Queensland) 
Vice Captain: 
Deputy Vice Captain: 
Australian Capital Territory	
Don Pyke (West Coast Eagles)
New South Wales
Stefan Carey (Sydney Swans)
Ben Doolan (Essendon Bombers)
Jason Mooney (Sydney Swans)
Northern Territory	
Nathan Buckley (Collingwood Magpies)
Ronnie Burns (Geelong Cats)
Gary Dhurrkay (Fremantle Dockers)
Andrew McLeod (Adelaide Crows)
Darryl White (Brisbane Lions)
Queensland
Jason Akermanis (Brisbane Lions)	
Marcus Ashcroft (Brisbane Lions)
Danny Dickfos (Brisbane Lions)
Clarke Keating (Brisbane Lions)
Tasmania	
Chris Bond (Richmond Tigers)
Darren Cresswell (Sydney Swans)
Brendon Gale (Richmond Tigers)
Michael Gale (Richmond Tigers)
Trent Nichols (Richmond Tigers)
James Shanahan (St Kilda Saints)
Paul Williams (Collingwood Magpies)

1998 Allies AFL State of Origin Squad vs Victoria in Brisbane
Coach: Damian Drum
Captain:
Vice Captain:
Deputy Vice Captain:
Australian Capital Territory	
Justin Blumfield (Essendon Bombers)
Aaron Hamill (Carlton Blues)
New South Wales
Shane Crawford (Sydney Swans)
Jason Mooney (Sydney Swans)
Brad Seymour (Sydney Swans)
Dean Solomon (Essendon Bombers)
Northern Territory	
Joel Bowden (Richmond Tigers)
Ronnie Burns  (Geelong Cats)
Darryl White (Brisbane Lions)
Queensland
Jason Akermanis (Brisbane Lions)	
Marcus Ashcroft (Brisbane Lions)
Danny Dickfos (Brisbane Lions)
Matthew Kennedy (Brisbane Lions)
Stephen Lawrence (Hawthorn Hawks)
Tasmania	
Daryn Cresswell (Sydney Swans)
Matthew Febey (Melbourne Demons)
Michael Gale  (Richmond Tigers)
Ben Harrison (Richmond Tigers)
Paul Hudson (Footscray/Western Bulldogs)
Michael Martin (Footscray/Western Bulldogs)
Dion Scott (Brisbane Lions)
Matthew Young (St Kilda Saints)

AFL Women's
In senior women's football, an Allies interstate team incorporated players from the traditional Allies states as well as South Australia and Western Australia for a one-off match against Victoria in July 2017 at Etihad Stadium. Victoria won by 97 points.

At the Under 18/19s level, composite teams under the Allies name have competed in the AFL Women's Under 18 Championships since the 2017 season; however, these are differently composed to the men's competition. In 2017, the Allies comprised players from South Australia, Northern Territory and Tasmania; and since 2018, two separate Allies teams have competed: the Central Allies (Northern Territory and South Australia) and Eastern Allies (New South Wales, ACT and Tasmania). Queensland, historically an Allies state in men's/boys' football, is one of the stronger states in women's football and competes stand-alone.

References

Allies State of Origin players
Australian rules interstate football
Australian rules football representative teams
Australian rules football State of Origin